Old Town Trolley Tours of St. Augustine is one of the two large tour bus companies in St. Augustine, Florida. The other is Red Train Tours. Both companies run trolleys of open cars that run on the streets of the city. Neither runs on tracks, both having pneumatic tires.

Overview
Old Town Trolley Tours operates open tour buses. It has a number of set stops in town and the passenger may get off and back on at will. Both have narrated tours presented by the drivers. The tour of Old Town Trolley Tours lasts about seventy minutes, if one stays on the bus for the entire route. For this tour, tickets purchased will remain valid for three consecutive days.

History
In the early 1970s Chris Belland, Mo Mosher, and Ed Swift combined efforts to restore historic storefronts in Key West, Florida. They saw that an increasing number of tourists were coming to the area, and therefore started Old Town Trolley tours to provide tours for visitors. They started with a converted bread truck and a homemade trailer. By the 1980s they were able to buy completely new equipment and they started touring trolleys in various cities, including Boston, Nashville, San Diego, Savannah, St. Augustine, and Washington, D.C.. The St. Augustine touring trolleys, the latest of the various city tours, were added in 2001.

Tour options
The standard hop-on and hop-off tour has been supplemented by other tours. The beach tour takes tourists to a number of stops on Anastasia Island and three beach stops north of Anastasia Island, starting at Vilano Beach. Most stops are at various beaches, although the bus stops at a number of other attractions on Anastasia Island.

Other tours are:
 The Ghosts & Gravestone Night Tour - trolley visits various spots at night during Halloween time.
 The Holly Jolly Holiday Trolley - St. Augustine area toured from mid-November to New Year's Day to see holiday lights.
 The trolleys can also be chartered by groups for various occasions.

References

Jacksonville metropolitan area
Tourist attractions in St. Augustine, Florida
Transportation in St. Johns County, Florida